Félix Desplan (born 22 February 1943 in Guadeloupe) is a French politician who was elected to the French Senate on 25 September 2011 representing the department of Guadeloupe.

References

Guadeloupean politicians
French Senators of the Fifth Republic
French people of Guadeloupean descent
1943 births
Living people
La République En Marche! politicians
Senators of Guadeloupe